Highway M02 is a Ukraine international highway (M-highway) connecting the M01 near Kipti with Bachivsk on the border with Russia, where it continues as the M3 to Moscow. The entire route is part of European route E101 and the section from Hlukhiv to the Russian border is part of European route E391.

The M02 stretches through both the Chernihiv Oblast and the Sumy Oblast and ends at the border checkpoint at Bachivsk which is part of Hlukhiv Raion. Route goes through several historical cities of the Cossack Ukraine of 17th century.

Route

Notes

See also

 Ukraine Highways
 International E-road network
 Pan-European corridors

References

External links
International Roads in Ukraine in Russian
European Roads in Russian

Roads in Chernihiv Oblast
Roads in Sumy Oblast